The culture of Uzbekistan has a wide mix of ethnic groups and cultures, with the Uzbeks being the majority group. In 1995, about 71% of Uzbekistan's population was Uzbek. The chief minority groups were Russians (8.4%), Tajiks (officially 5%, but believed to be much higher), Kazaks (4.1%), Tatars (2.4%), and Karakalpaks (2.1%), and other minority groups include Armenians and Koryo-saram. It is said however that the number of non-indigenous people living in Uzbekistan is decreasing as Russians and other minority groups slowly leave and Uzbeks return from other parts of the former Soviet Union.

Heritage
Cultural heritage sites in Uzbekistan inscribed on the UNESCO World Heritage List include: 
 Historic Centre of Bukhara (1993)
 Historic Centre of Shakhrisyabz (2000)
 Itchan Kala (1990)
 Samarkand – Crossroads of Cultures (2001)

Religion
 

When Uzbekistan gained independence in 1991 it was widely believed that Muslim fundamentalism would spread across the region. The expectation was that an Islamic country long denied freedom of religious practice would undergo a very rapid increase in the expression of its dominant faith. In 1994 about more than half of Uzbeks were said to belong to Islam, though in an official survey few of that number had any real knowledge of the religion or knew how to practice it.

Education

Uzbekistan has a high literacy rate with about 98% of adults above the age of 15 being able to read and write. However, with only 76% of the under 15 population currently enrolled in education this figure may drop in the future. Uzbekistan has encountered severe budgeting shortfalls in its education program. The education law of 1992 began the process of theoretical reform, but the physical base has deteriorated, and curriculum revision has been slow ...

Traditions
Uzbeks celebrate the New Year in a celebration called Yangi Yil. They decorate a New Year tree, They celebrate New Year's Eve, and give each other gifts. They sing and listen to traditional Uzbek music while having dinner, and after dinner, a man dressed as Santa and Father Time arrive and continue the celebration. At midnight, they sing the Uzbek National Anthem to welcome a new year, and continue celebrating. Moreover, the most popular holiday for Uzbeks is Nowruz, and it is deemed to be the most historical one. Colourful traditional costumes and variety of meals on the laid table take the main pattern of the holiday. However, the main course of the holiday is Sumalak, which should be boiled the whole night.

Cuisine

Uzbek cuisine is influenced by local agriculture, as in most nations. There is a great deal of grain farming in Uzbekistan, so breads and noodles are of importance, and Uzbek cuisine has been characterized as "noodle-rich". Mutton is a popular variety of meat due to the abundance of sheep in the country and it is part of various Uzbek dishes.

Uzbekistan's signature dish is palov (plov or osh), a main course typically made with rice, pieces of meat, and grated carrots and onions. Oshi Nahor, or Morning Plov, is served in the early morning (between 6 and 9 am) to large gatherings of guests, typically as part of an ongoing wedding celebration. Other notable national dishes include: shurpa (shurva or shorva), a soup made of large pieces of fatty meat (usually mutton) and vegetables; norin and lagman, noodle-based dishes that may be served as a soup or a main course; manti, chuchvara, and somsa, stuffed pockets of dough served as an appetizer or a main course; dimlama (a meat and vegetable stew) and various kebabs, usually served as a main course.

Green tea is the national hot beverage taken throughout the day; teahouses (chaikhanas) are of cultural importance. The more usual black tea is preferred in Tashkent, both green and black teas are typically taken without milk or sugar. Tea always accompanies a meal, but it is also a drink of hospitality, automatically offered green or black to every guest. Ayran, a chilled yogurt drink, is popular in summer, but does not replace hot tea.

The use of alcohol is less widespread than in the west, but wine is comparatively popular for a Muslim nation as Uzbekistan is largely secular. Uzbekistan has 14 wineries, the oldest and most famous being the Khovrenko Winery in Samarkand (est. 1927). The Samarkand Winery produces a range of dessert wines from local grape varieties: Gulyakandoz, Shirin, Aleatiko, and Kabernet likernoe (literally Cabernet dessert wine in Russian). Uzbek wines have received international awards and are exported to Russia and other countries in Central Asia.

The choice of desserts in Bukharan Jewish and Uzbek cuisines are limited. A typical festive meal ends with fruit or a compote of fresh or dried fruit, followed by nuts and halvah with green tea. A Bukharan Jewish specialty for guests on a Shabbat afternoon is Chai Kaymoki - green tea mixed, contrary to the standard Uzbek practice, with a generous measure of milk (in 1:1 proportions) and a tablespoon of butter in the teapot. The tea is sometimes sprinkled with chopped almonds or walnuts before serving.

Sport

Uzbekistan is home to former racing cyclist Djamolidine Abdoujaparov. Abdoujaparov has won the points contest in the Tour de France three times, each time winning the coveted green jersey. The green jersey is second only to the yellow jersey. Abdoujaparov was a specialist at winning stages in tours or one day races when the bunch or peloton would finish together. He would often 'sprint' in the final kilometer and had a reputation as being dangerous in these bunch sprints as he would weave side to side in a sprint. This reputation earned him the nickname 'The Terror of Tashkent'. Artur Taymazov won Uzbekistan's first wrestling medal at the 2000 Summer Olympics, as well as two gold medals at both the 2004 Summer Olympics and 2008 Summer Olympics in Men's 120 kg.

Ruslan Chagaev is a professional boxer representing Uzbekistan in the WBA. He won the WBA champion title in 2007, after defeating Russian Nikolai Valuev. Chagaev defended his title twice before losing it to Vladimir Klitschko in 2009.

Uzbekistan is the home of the International Kurash Association. Kurash is an internationalized and modernized form of the traditional Uzbek fighting art of Kurash.

Football is the most popular sport in Uzbekistan. Uzbekistan's premier football league is the Uzbek League, which features 16 teams. The current champions are FC Bunyodkor, and the team with the most championships is FC Pakhtakor Tashkent with eight. The current player of the year (2010) is Server Djeparov. Uzbekistan regularly participates in the AFC Champions League and the AFC Cup. Nasaf won AFC Cup in 2011, which is the first international club cup for Uzbek football.

Before Uzbekistan's independence in 1991, the country used to be part of the Soviet Union football, rugby union, ice hockey, basketball, and handball national teams. After Uzbekistan got split up from the Soviet Union, Uzbekistan created its own football, rugby union, and futsal national teams.

Other popular sports in Uzbekistan include rugby union, handball, baseball, ice hockey, basketball, and futsal.

See also
 Islam in Uzbekistan
 Christianity in Uzbekistan
 Cinema of Uzbekistan
 Music of Uzbekistan
 Scout Association of Uzbekistan
 Public holidays in Uzbekistan

References
 This article contains some text originally adapted from the public domain Library of Congress Country Study for Uzbekistan at http://lcweb2.loc.gov/frd/cs/uztoc.html''

 

pt:Uzbequistão#Cultura